Johann Burckhardt may refer to:

Johann Karl Burckhardt (1773–1825), German astronomer and mathematician
Johann Ludwig Burckhardt (1784–1817), Swiss traveler, geographer, and orientalist
Johann Gottlieb Burckhardt (1836–1907), Swiss psychiatrist 
Johann Jakob Burckhardt (1903–2006), Swiss mathematician and crystallographer

See also
Johann Burchard (c. 1450–1506), Renaissance priest and chronicler